Fimbulheimen is a mountain range in Queen Maud Land, Antarctica. It stretches from Jutulstraumen by 1° west of Carsten Borchgrevink Ice at 18° east, about 200 km from the ice edge. Fimbulheimen is thus between Maudheim Plateau and Sør-Rondane.

Dronning Maud's highest mountain, Jøkulkyrkja (elevation 3148 m), is located in Mühlig-Hofmann Mountains in Fimbulheimen. The name comes from Fimbulvetr, the harsh winter immediately preceding Ragnarok in Norse mythology.

A number of smaller ranges and mountain areas constitutes Fimbulheimen, from west to east:
Gburek Peaks         
Sverdrup Mountains  
Gjelsvik Mountains       
Mühlig-Hofmann Mountains 
Orvin Mountains          
Filchner Mountains      
Drygalski Mountains     
Kurze Mountains     
Gagarin Mountains         
Conrad Mountains        
Mount Dallmann     
Wohlthat Mountains     
Humboldt Mountains      
Petermann Ranges    
Gruber Mountains        
Hoel Mountains           
Weyprecht Mountains     
Payer Mountains         
Lomonosov Mountains      

 
The Norwegian research station Troll is located by Jutulsessen Mountain west in Fimbulheimen, while the ornithological field station Tor is about 100 km further east at Svarthamaren Mountain in Mühlig-Hofmann Mountains.

Large parts of the area were mapped by the Norwegian Antarctic Expedition 1956-60. The Norwegian Polar Institute has published twelve map sheets of Fimbulheimen in scale 1:250 000.

References

Mountain ranges of Queen Maud Land
Princess Astrid Coast